Mercy Murugi is a noted Kenyan film producer and production manager who has worked on a number of local and international projects including Worse Than War, Stranded with Cash Peters. She has worked with National Geographic, Discovery Channel, BBC, among other global production houses and TV channels.  Her most recent project is a feature film called Togetherness Supreme, shot on the Red One camera and filmed in Kibera. Murugi is currently a producer at Page83 films.

External links
Mercy Murugi IMDB
reference
Article on Togetherness Supreme
Hot Sun Films
Hot Sun Films on Imdb
reference

Kenyan film producers
Living people
Place of birth missing (living people)
Year of birth missing (living people)